Edite Ramos da Costa Tenjua (born 31 December 1972) is a São Tomé and Príncipe lawyer and businesswoman who was Minister of Justice from 2012–2014, served on the country's Constitutional Court from 2019–2020, and has been Minister of Foreign Affairs since September 2020.

Early life and education
Tenjua was born in Africa on 31 December 1972 and moved to Portugal in 1976. She has a law degree from the University of Lisbon, graduating in 1999.

Career
Tenjua practiced as a lawyer in Portugal and Mozambique, before becoming director of the Tax and Legal Department of KPMG Angola. In 2004, she joined Joint Authority Nigeria-S. Tomé and Principe as a lawyer, managing its legal unit from 2008 until 2010.

Tenjua is an entrepreneur and since 2006 the owner of TEN JUA Collection Fashion Brand, with stores in Sao Tome, Nigeria, and Portugal. She has also written several children's books includingTita Catita. She heads a foundation called El-Shaddai, which works with disadvantaged children in Africa to emphasise education.

Tenjua was Minister of Justice from 2012 to 2014. In 2019, she was the Petroleum Affairs Advisor to the Prime Minister of São Tomé and Príncipe, before being elected to the Constitutional Court after three judges were dismissed following a disciplinary process after being accused by Prime Minister Patrice Trovoada of taking bribes in a case related to the sale of brewery Cervejeira Rosema to an Angolan company.

Tenjua was appointed Foreign Minister by Prime Minister Jorge Bom Jesus on 21 September, replacing Elsa Teixeira Pinto.

Personal life
Tenjua is a Christian.

References

Living people
 1972 births
University of Lisbon alumni
KPMG people
21st-century women politicians
Women government ministers of São Tomé and Príncipe
Justice ministers
Female justice ministers
Foreign Ministers of São Tomé and Príncipe
Female foreign ministers
21st-century São Tomé and Príncipe politicians